Stephen Simmons (born 6 August 1984) is a Scottish former professional boxer who competed from 2011 to 2018. He held multiple regional championships at cruiserweight, including the WBC International Silver title from 2013 to 2015 and the IBF European title in 2017. He also challenged for the British cruiserweight title in 2018.

Amateur career
Stephen Simmons started boxing aged 12 and fought his entire Amateur Career out of renowned Scottish Amateur Boxing Club Leith Victoria AAC, being coached by his Uncle Kenny who boxed for Scotland at Middleweight. He won numerous trophies throughout Europe since 2004, having around 115 Amateur contests winning approximately 80 of them. Simmons competed in the 2010 Commonwealth Games held in Delhi, winning the Bronze Medal in the 91 kg Heavyweight Division.

Professional career
He is currently trained by Billy Nelson. Simmons is managed by MTK Global (Mathew Macklin).

According to Boxrec, in October 2016, Simmons was ranked 5th in the UK and 46th in the World at Cruiserweight level.

On 27 June, 2014, Simmons battled against Noel Gevor in Hamburg, Germany. Simmons was aggressive throughout the fight, while Gevor boxed well, but neither fighter looked like they did enough to win the rounds by a clear margin. In the end, it was a very close fight, and the judges scored it 116-112 twice for Gevor, and 116-113, awarding Gevor the split-decision win.

On 17 March, 2018, Simmons fought Matty Askin for the vacant British cruiserweight belt. Simmons was outmatched by Askin, losing the fight in the second round via TKO.

In April 2018, Simmons announced that he is retiring from the sport of boxing.

Personal life
Simmons married his fiancee Nicole on 1 June 2014. They live in Edinburgh and they have 3 children.

Professional boxing record 

| style="text-align:center;" colspan="8"|18 Wins (7 knockouts, 11 decisions), 3 Losses, 0 Draws 
|-  style="text-align:center; background:#e3e3e3;"
|  style="border-style:none none solid solid; "|Res.
|  style="border-style:none none solid solid; "|Record
|  style="border-style:none none solid solid; "|Opponent
|  style="border-style:none none solid solid; "|Type
|  style="border-style:none none solid solid; "|Rd., Time
|  style="border-style:none none solid solid; "|Date
|  style="border-style:none none solid solid; "|Location
|  style="border-style:none none solid solid; "|Notes
|- align=center
|Loss
|15–2
|align=left| Noel Gevor
|
|
|
|align=left|
|align=left|
|- align=center
|Win
|15–1
|align=left| Lars Buchholz
|
|
|
|align=left|
|align=left|
|- align=center
|Win
|14–1
|align=left| Remigijus Žiaušys
|
|
|
|align=left|
|align=left|
|- align=center
|Win
|13–1
|align=left| Imantas Davidaitis
|
|
|
|align=left|
|align=left|
|- align=center
|Win
|12–1
|align=left| Jiří Svačina
|
|
|
|align=left|
|align=left|
|- align=center
|Loss
|11–1
|align=left| Jon-Lewis Dickinson
|
|
|
|align=left|
|align=left|
|- align=center
|Win
|11–0
|align=left| Courtney Richards
|
|
|
|align=left|
|align=left|
|- align=center
|Win
|10–0
|align=left| Wadi Camacho
|
|
|
|align=left|
|align=left|
|- align=center
|Win
|9–0
|align=left| David Graf
|
|
|
|align=left|
|align=left|
|- align=center
|Win
|8–0
|align=left| Michael Sweeney
|
|
|
|align=left|
|align=left|
|- align=center
|Win
|7–0
|align=left| Jovan Kaludjerovic
|
|
|
|align=left|
|align=left|
|- align=center
|Win
|6–0
|align=left| Tayar Mehmed
|
|
|
|align=left|
|align=left|
|- align=center
|Win
|5–0
|align=left| Jevgēņijs Andrejevs
|
|
|
|align=left|
|align=left|
|- align=center
|Win
|4–0
|align=left| Hastings Rasani
|
|
|
|align=left|
|align=left|
|- align=center
|Win
|3–0
|align=left| John Anthony
|
|
|
|align=left|
|align=left|
|- align=center
|Win
|2–0
|align=left| Hari Miles
|
|
|
|align=left|
|align=left|
|- align=center
|Win
|1–0
|align=left| Nick Okoth
|
|
|
|align=left|
|align=left|

References

External links

 
 
Stephen Simmons - Profile, News Archive & Current Rankings at Box.Live

Scottish male boxers
1984 births
Cruiserweight boxers
Living people
Boxers from Edinburgh
Commonwealth Games bronze medallists for Scotland
Commonwealth Games medallists in boxing
Boxers at the 2010 Commonwealth Games
Medallists at the 2010 Commonwealth Games